Richibucto is a community in Kent County, New Brunswick, Canada. It held town status prior to 2023.

Geography
The town is situated on the Richibucto River where it discharges into the Northumberland Strait.

History

Richibucto had been the location of an annual Mi'kmaq summer coastal community prior to British colonisation. The town takes its name from "Elsipogtog" or "L'sipuktuk" Mi'kmaq terms meaning "river of fire". It is believed the term was mispronounced, or misunderstood from the Mi'kmaq language. See Elsipogtog First Nation.

On 1 January 2023, Richibucto amalgamated with the village of Saint-Louis de Kent and all or part of four local service districts to form the new town of Beaurivage. The community's name remains in official use.

Demographics

Religious make-up (2001)

Income (2006)

Mother tongue language (2016)

Economy 
The downtown area, situated on the mouth of the river, has commercial fishing wharves, several restaurants, and local stores. The economy is dominated by lobster and deep sea fishing.

Attractions

 St. Louis de Gonzague Roman Catholic Church was completed in 1965. Designed by Belanger and Roy of Moncton, it was inspired by the designs of the Spanish architect, Félix Candela.

Notable people

 Kate McPhelim Cleary (1863–1905), novelist
 Murray MacLaren (1861–1942), doctor, politician
 George McLeod (1836–1905),
 James D. Phinney (November 17, 1844 – ) lawyer, judge, politician
 Henry Powell (1855–1930), politician
 Louis Robichaud (1925–2005), former Premier of New Brunswick
 Peter Veniot (1863–1926), former Premier of New Brunswick
 Charles Wesley Weldon (1830–1896), lawyer, politician

See also
List of lighthouses in New Brunswick
List of communities in New Brunswick

References

External links
 Aids to Navigation Canadian Coast Guard

Communities in Kent County, New Brunswick
Former towns in New Brunswick
Populated coastal places in Canada
Lighthouses in New Brunswick